Gangatheri is a village and gram panchayat in Assandh, Karnal district, Haryana, India.  Its 1991 population was 2628. It belongs to karnal Division . It is located 57 KM towards west from District head quarters Karnal. 12 KM from Assandh. 160 KM from State capital Chandigarh

It is an ancient village that was in the state of Punjab and became part of Haryana after its separation in 1966. It was established in 1165 before the Mughal era by a person called Gangu.

Bahari (4 KM), Ardana (6 KM), Thall (7 KM), Bandrala (9 KM), Kheri Sharf Ali (12 KM) are the nearby Villages to Gangatheri. Gangatheri is surrounded by Pillukhera Tehsil towards South, Assandh Tehsil towards East, Safidon Tehsil towards East, Rajound Tehsil towards North .

Assandh, Safidon, Jind, Kaithal are the near by Cities to Gangatheri.

This Place is in the border of the Karnal District and Kaithal District. Kaithal District Rajound is North towards this place . Also it is in the Border of other district Jind .

Colleges near Gangatheri 
JC COLLEGE ASSANDH

GOVT COLLEGE ALEWA

GOVT COLLEGE JAISINGHPURA

Schools in Gangatheri,Assandh

Shiv Public School

S B S Sr Sec School

Govt. Sr. Sec. School Gangatheri Karnal

divyakulam global school

Temples in Gangatheri,Assandh

Sirdi Baba 
HANUMAN MANDIR

Bharmanandh Mandir

 Pir Baba

Bahrli Mata

References

PARKS IN GANGATHERI 
BHAGWAN PARSHURAM PARK

Shaheed Karambir Singh Foji Children Park

Gangatheri Popran Ground

Villages in Karnal district